Tynanthus elegans, the cipó-cravo or cipó-trindade in Portuguese, is a species of flowering plants in the family Bignoniaceae. It is found in Bolivia and Brazil.

References

External links 
 
 Tynanthus elegans at The Plant List
 Tynanthus elegans at Tropicos

Bignoniaceae
Plants described in 1863
Flora of Bolivia
Flora of Brazil